Dieter Kratzsch (born 2 June 1939) is a German former ice hockey player who competed for ASK Vorwärts Crimmitschau. He played 109 games for the East Germany national ice hockey team from 1959 to 1968, including the 1968 Winter Olympics in Grenoble.

References

1939 births
German ice hockey defencemen
Living people
Ice hockey players at the 1968 Winter Olympics
Olympic ice hockey players of East Germany
People from Crimmitschau
Sportspeople from Saxony